Denice D. Lewis (born November 28, 1960) is an American fashion model, actor, and abstract artist. Following her modeling career, Lewis returned to America to further study visual arts in Hollywood including photography, fine art painting, and film making. She appeared as an actor in several films, including End of Days (1999) with Arnold Schwarzenegger, and television shows such as Red Shoe Diaries. After taking a break from public life, she now works as a creative entrepreneur and consultant in Los Angeles.

Modeling
As a model she was represented by various agencies including Wilhelmina, Models 1, Ford, and Elite Model Management. She is represented by Acuity Artists in Los Angeles. She appeared on a number of magazine covers, including Vogue, Tatler and Town & Country.

Magazine covers

Acting career
Alongside appearances in music videos such as Kiss and Tell by Bryan Ferry, Slow Rivers by Elton John and Cliff Richard, and I'm Too Sexy by Right Said Fred; Lewis pursued an acting career. She landed various parts in episodes of the TV shows Red Shoe Diaries, Burke's Law (January 1994), Silk Stalkings, and Renegade. She also appeared in films, including H.P. Lovecraft’s Necronomicon: Book of the Dead as the drowned wife, Ed Wood’s I Woke Up Early the Day I Died, and as Arnold Schwarzenegger’s wife in End of Days.

Music Videos

Television

Film

Personal life

In the early 2000s Lewis, during a hiatus from public life, became an abstract impressionist artist in Los Angeles specializing in memorial paintings in which the ashes of the deceased are mixed with the pigment. Lewis married Al Seckel in Las Vegas in 2004. Though they had apparently separated, and Sekel later remarried before his death in 2015, the marriage was never annulled.

References

External links
 

Denice Lewis Studios Website http://denicelewisstudios.com

1960 births
Living people
San Jacinto College alumni
Female models from Virginia
American actresses
21st-century American women